Leed was a carbonated lemonade soft drink sold in the middle and late 20th century.

It was produced and distributed by Coca-Cola Amatil in New Zealand, Australia, the United Kingdom and Fiji. In 1984, Leed was discontinued and replaced by the more widely known Sprite brand. Accompanying this change was also a new recipe.

Leed Lemon Soda Squash was a variant which was replaced by Mello Yello in the early 1980s.

See also
 List of defunct consumer brands
 List of lemonade topics

References

Soft drinks
Lemonade
Australian drinks
Products introduced in 1967
Defunct consumer brands
Coca-Cola brands